James Claude Malin (born Edgeley, North Dakota; February 8, 1893 - January 26, 1979) was an American historian and professor of history who taught at the University of Kansas and was involved with the Kansas Historical Society, including as its president.

Bibliography
The United States after the World War, New York, Books for Libraries Press, 1972
John Brown and the Legend of Fifty-Six
Essays on Historiography
The Nebraska Question, 1852-1854
Confounded Rot about Napoleon : Reflections Upon Science and Technology, nationalism, World Depression of the Eighteen-Nineties, and Afterwards
The Grassland of North America : prolegomena to its History, 1947	
Winter Wheat in the Golden Belt of Kansas

References

1893 births
1979 deaths
University of Kansas faculty
20th-century American historians
American male non-fiction writers
20th-century American male writers